In taxonomy, the Methanosaetaceae are a family of microbes within the order Methanosarcinales. All species within this family use acetate as their sole source of energy.

See also
 List of Archaea genera

References

Further reading

Scientific journals

Scientific books

Scientific databases

External links

Archaea taxonomic families
Euryarchaeota